Eldon Martins Maquemba, known as Maquemba  (born 8 June 1984), is an Angolan professional footballer who played as a striker and as a winger. He also holds Portuguese citizenship.

Career
Maquemba was born in Benguela, Angola. He started his senior career with Clube Oriental de Lisboa, in the Portuguese Second Division. and played also in the same league with teams Clube Desportivo dos Olivais e Moscavide, A.D. Portomosense, Imortal Desportivo Clube.

In 2007, Maquemba signed with Swedish team Bodens BK. A year later, he moved to England to play for Halesowen Town F.C. For the 2008–09 season, he signed with Olympiakos Nicosia in Cyprus and was sold in January 2009 to Clube Recreativo da Caála in Angola. In January 2010, he was close to signing a two-year deal with Peñarol of Uruguay but signed with Vietnamese club Đồng Tâm Long An F.C. In 2010, Maquemba was winner of BTV Cup with Đồng Tâm Long An, after a win against Matsubara from Brasil.

In 2012 Maquemba moved to Angola, signing a two-year deal with Progresso Associação do Sambizanga in the Girabola.

In 2016, Maquemba joined Swedish club Syrianska FC.

International career
In November 2004, Maquemba was part of Angola's 29-man provisional squad for the COSAFA Cup final.

Honours

Club
Đồng Tâm Long An
 BTV Cup: 2010

International
Angola
 COSAFA Cup: 2004

References

External links
  

Living people
1984 births
People from Benguela
Association football forwards
Association football wingers
Angolan footballers
Portuguese footballers
C.D. Olivais e Moscavide players
Bodens BK players
Clube Oriental de Lisboa players
Olympiakos Nicosia players
Halesowen Town F.C. players
Imortal D.C. players
Angola international footballers
UiTM FC players
Syrianska FC players
Girabola players
Cypriot Second Division players
Expatriate footballers in Portugal
Expatriate footballers in Sweden
Angolan expatriate footballers
Angolan expatriate sportspeople in Malaysia
Expatriate footballers in Cyprus
Expatriate footballers in England
Expatriate footballers in Vietnam
Expatriate footballers in Malaysia
Angolan expatriate sportspeople in Cyprus
Angolan expatriate sportspeople in England
Angolan expatriate sportspeople in Vietnam